Peridea basitriens, the oval-based prominent, is a species of moth in the family Notodontidae (the prominents). It was first described by Francis Walker in 1855 and it is found in North America.

The MONA or Hodges number for Peridea basitriens is 7919.

References

Further reading

External links

 

Notodontidae
Articles created by Qbugbot
Moths described in 1855